Robert Force (born in Snohomish, Washington) is a performer and composer on Appalachian dulcimer. He is also a producer, and the author of In Search of the Wild Dulcimer, Wild Dulcimer Songbook, and Pacific Rim Dulcimer Songbook.

Biography

Discography

As principal recording artist 

Pacific Rim Dulcimer Project,
Crossover,
The Art of Dulcimer,
When the Moon Fell on California,
Manitou: In the Garden of the Gods,
Did You

As guest recording artist 

Hellman: Dulcimer Duets,
Hellman: Dulcimer Aires, Ballads and Bears,
Einhorn: Whole World Round,
Stephens: Under the Porchlight

As producer

See also
 List of Appalachian dulcimer players

External links
In Search of the Wild Dulcimer - free online version of the book on the author's site.
Robert Force - Personal website, includes a biography and instructional materials such as pages about individual songs with links to lyrics / music PDFs.
Kindred Gathering - The oldest dulcimer gathering in the U. S., started in 1975 by Robert Force and Albert d’Ossché.

Year of birth missing (living people)
Living people
American folk musicians
Appalachian dulcimer players
Appalachian culture